Newbiggin is a farm in the civil parish of Lanchester, in the County Durham district, in the ceremonial county of Durham, England.

Lanchester, County Durham